Kutaisi State Historical Museum, formally known as the Niko Berdzenishvili Kutaisi State History Museum, is a museum in Kutaisi, Georgia.  A major museum, it is also considered to be one of the most important scientific-research institutions in Georgia with its extensive research library and laboratory.

The museum, which was established in 1921–22 in the former National Bank of Georgia building, contains more than 190,000 artifacts, displaying the archaeological, numismatic, paleographical, ethnographical and spiritual heritage of Georgia.

References 

Museums in Georgia (country)
Buildings and structures in Kutaisi
History museums in Georgia (country)
Tourist attractions in Imereti
Museums established in 1922
1922 establishments in Georgia (country)
Kutaisi